Boreas River is a river in Essex County and Hamilton County in the U.S. State of New York. Boreas River begins at Boreas Ponds north-northeast of the Hamlet of Boreas River and flows southeastward before converging with the Hudson River southeast of Forks Mountain.

References

Rivers of New York (state)
Rivers of Essex County, New York
Rivers of Hamilton County, New York